Xeralictus is a genus of sweat bees in the family Halictidae. There are at least three described species in Xeralictus.

Species
These three species belong to the genus Xeralictus:
 Xeralictus bicuspidariae Snelling & Stage, 1995
 Xeralictus biscuspidariae
 Xeralictus timberlakei Cockerell, 1927

References

Further reading

External links

 

Halictidae
Articles created by Qbugbot